Mitromorpha bella is a species of sea snail, a marine gastropod mollusk in the family Mitromorphidae.

Description

Distribution
This species occurs in the Caribbean Sea off Cuba.

References

 Espinosa J. & Ortea J. (2014). Nuevas especies de moluscos gasteropodos (Mollusca: Gastropoda) del Parque Nacional Alejandro de Humboldt, sector Baracoa, Guantanamo, Cuba. Revista de la Academia Canaria de Ciencias. 26: 195–223. page(s): 213, pl. 5C

bella
Gastropods described in 2014